= EMINTS =

eMINTS
- Founded: 1999
- Type: Provider of Comprehensive Research-based Professional Development Services to Educators
- Purpose: eMINTS National Center: transforming education for all learners through high-quality teaching powered by technology.
- Location: Columbia, MO
- Region served: Missouri, Utah, Illinois, Maine, Minnesota, Nevada, Alabama, and Ohio
- Key people: Monca Beglau, Executive Director
- Website: http://www.emints.org/

eMINTS is an educational program designed to train educators of children in the United States. The program's goals focus on technology in the classroom as well as social interaction and student research. The program began in the US state of Missouri. It was originally an acronym for "enhancing Missouri's Instructional Networked Teaching Strategies", but is now used in Utah, Illinois, Maine, Minnesota, Nevada, and Ohio as well.

The program is now being used with over 20,000 students in third to twelfth grade.

== Instructional Model ==
eMINTS professional development uses interactive group sessions and in-classroom coaching/mentoring to help teachers integrate technology into their teaching using an instructional model that supports high-quality lesson design, promotes inquiry-based learning, creates technology-rich learning environments, and builds community among students and teachers. These components comprise eMINTS's instructional model.

eMINTS professional development is available from eMINTS staff instructional specialists and through a “train-the-trainer” program called the eMINTS Affiliate Trainer program (formerly Professional Development for Educational Technology Specialists (PD4ETS).
